Awa Guèye (born 31 August 1978 in Dakar) is a Senegalese former basketball player for the Senegal women's national basketball team who competed in the 2000 Summer Olympics. She also competed with Senegal at the 2006 and 2010 FIBA World Championships for Women as well as at the 2008 World Qualifying Tournament for the Summer Olympics.

References

1978 births
Living people
Basketball players from Dakar
Senegalese women's basketball players
Olympic basketball players of Senegal
Basketball players at the 2000 Summer Olympics
African Games gold medalists for Senegal
African Games medalists in basketball
Competitors at the 2003 All-Africa Games
Competitors at the 2007 All-Africa Games